The Secret Life of Machines is an educational television series presented by Tim Hunkin and Rex Garrod, in which the two explain the inner workings and history of common household and office machinery. According to Hunkin, the show's creator, the programme was developed from his comic strip The Rudiments of Wisdom, which he researched and drew for the Observer newspaper over a period of 14 years. Three separate groupings of the broadcast were produced and originally shown between 1988 and 1993 on Channel 4 in the United Kingdom, with the production subsequently broadcast on The Learning Channel and the Discovery Channel in the U.S.

Contents 

Each of the Secret Lifes individual series covers a particular set of machines. The first addresses household appliances, while the second includes devices used outside the home, such as the car. The third series examines the contraptions and gadgets used in a modern office.

Each episode was given an individual title, such as The Secret Life of the Vacuum Cleaner'''. Although ostensibly about a specific appliance or piece of technology, the scope of each episode was often widened to cover related technologies as well. For example, the video recorder episode looked at magnetic recording from its origins, and featured Hunkin and Garrod recording their voices on a crude home-made "audio tape" consisting of rust-coated sticky tape.

Another aspect of the programmes was their use of humorous animations based on Hunkin's own drawings. These cartoons were often based around the historical figures involved in the development of a particular technology. Furthermore, the illustrations were an artistic commentary on modern society, including segments on lift fantasies (as shown in the episode "The Lift") and corporate disregard for individuals' rights (featured in many episodes, including "The Radio" and "The Car").

Each programme concluded with an epilogue consisting of an elaborate installation, which resembled an aspect of the machine or technology under discussion. One example was a giant statue resembling a robot, which had been built from scrap computer monitors, printers and other parts, which was blown up using pyrotechnics. Hunkin described the destruction as an allegorical point that computers are just a collection of transistors and lack "superhuman intelligence".

 Production 
All the series used a combination of mechanical models and animation to help explain various aspect of how the subject devices function. The animation for the series was done by Hunkin himself in a uniquely recognisable format.

 Episode list 

 Series 1 (1988) 

The first series covers household appliances.

 Series 2 (1991) 
In the second group of programmes, devices used outside the home are investigated. The first two episodes are closely related, both dealing with the car and similar vehicles.

 Series 3 - The Secret Life of the Office (1993) 
The third and final series concentrated on office-related technology. It also introduced an animated set of fictional characters who worked in the offices of the fictional Utopia Services company.

 The Secret Life of Components 

Coinciding with the release of the remastered original episodes of The Secret Life Of Machines (see below), Tim Hunkin began a self-produced spiritual successor called The Secret Life of Components''. It explored some of the individual parts that so often make up the appliances and machines that were the focus of the original series. The 8 weekly episodes included what Hunkin has learned through his experience with the component, along with many models for demonstration and examples from his amusement machines and other works. It premiered March 3, 2021 on Hunkin's YouTube channel with an episode on chain and belts. In the last episode of series 1, Hunkin commented that he may make another series the following winter. A 5 episode second series then debuted in spring 2022.

Series 1 (2021)

Series 2 (2022)

Creative uses 
Hunkin and Garrod used the series to show some of their devices they built from parts of machines featured on their programme. The creations, some of which were decorative, others functional, show the potential uses of broken machinery. An extreme example is the giant clock powered by steam. In the epilogue for the remastered version of the episode, Hunkin mentions that the clock has been non functional for a long time.

Availability 
The series has subsequently become available on online streaming sites on the Internet. , no home formats have been officially released.

Tim Hunkin himself encourages others to download the series from a number of nominated websites.

In March 2021, Hunkin began posting remastered versions of the episodes to YouTube. These were upscaled from an analogue video source to improve the image quality and include a short, recently filmed epilogue by Hunkin on each episode. The first 6 remastered episodes, comprising the complete first series, were posted to YouTube on Saturday, March 13, 2021. Starting on Thursday, May 6, 2021, Tim started posting episodes from Series 2 at a rate of one a week (give or take a day). As of June 12, 2021, all 6 remastered episodes from this series have been posted on his channel. Series 3 is following a similar weekly schedule, with the Fax Machine episode being posted on June 18, 2021. All of the six episodes have been posted, with the final episode released on July 22, 2021.

References

External links 
 The Secret Life Of Machines Home Page
 Section on TV writing and presenting on Tim Hunkin's homepage
 Alternate Link to the Entire Series in Various Formats
 Tim Hunkin's official YouTube channel

Channel 4 original programming
1988 British television series debuts
1993 British television series endings
1980s British documentary television series
1990s British documentary television series
Documentary television series about technology
English-language television shows